Prijevor may refer to:

Bosnia and Herzegovina

 Prijevor, Bileća, village in Bileća
 Prijevor, Foča, plateau on the Maglić mountain
 Prijevor, Kladanj, a village in Kladanj

Croatia

 Prijevor, Dubrovnik, village in Dubrovnik
 Prijevor, Mljet, group of villages in Mljet

Montenegro

 Prijevor, Budva, village in Budva
 Prijevor, Herceg Novi, village in Herceg Novi

Serbia

 Prijevor, Čačak, village in Čačak